Pyramid Peak is a peak,  high, surmounting Cape Buller at the west side of the entrance to the Bay of Isles, South Georgia Island. It was mapped in 1902 by the Swedish Antarctic Expedition and named descriptively "Die Pyramide."

References

Mountains and hills of South Georgia